The 21st annual Four Hills Tournament was won by East German athlete Hans-Georg Aschenbach. After a dominating victory at the first event in Oberstdorf, and three more podium finishes, he ended up with a 43-point lead over second-placed Walter Steiner, who became the first Swiss to win a Four Hills event in Garmisch-Partenkirchen.

Participating nations and athletes

Results

Oberstdorf
 Schattenbergschanze, Oberstdorf
30 December 1973

Garmisch-Partenkirchen
 Große Olympiaschanze, Garmisch-Partenkirchen
1 January 1974

Walter Steiner became the first Swiss ski jumper to win an event at a Four Hills Tournament. After a second result that placed him far ahead of the main field, Hans-Georg Aschenbach left the New Year's event with a lead of 34 points to his closest rival, Hans Schmid.

Innsbruck
 Bergiselschanze, Innsbruck
3 January 1974

Bischofshofen
 Paul-Ausserleitner-Schanze, Bischofshofen
5 January 1974

Final ranking

References

External links
 FIS website
 Four Hills Tournament web site

Four Hills Tournament
1973 in ski jumping
1974 in ski jumping